Melissa Murray (born 1954) is a British poet and playwright.

She is a recipient of the Eric Gregory Award and the Verity Bargate Award.

References

Living people
1954 births
20th-century British dramatists and playwrights
British women dramatists and playwrights
British women poets